BBC Pashto is the Pashto-language station of the BBC World Service. It was launched in August 1981, and reaches out to the over 50-60 million Pashto speakers in Afghanistan and Pakistan, as well as the Pashtun diaspora around the world. Nabi Misdaq was its first editor.

Radio 
Initially, the service only broadcast radio programmes - mainly News and current affairs, however, it later expanded by introducing entertainment slots, long form, features, magazines, hard talk and interactive shows such as Stasy Ghag Your Voice which is still very popular among its audience.

Online 
In 2002, BBC Pashto launched its web page BBCPashto.com. In recent years they have expanded their presence on the social platform. Now BBC Pashto is available on Facebook, Instagram, YouTube, Twitter, and Soundcloud.

TV 
On January the 20th 2014, the section began its 15-minute daily news bulletins  - Aired via its partner station in Afghanistan Shamshad TV, the bulletin soon became popular and had a weekly audience of around 1.5 million (2015). The transmission time was 1230 GMT/1700 Afg Time. Ismail Miakhail was the launch producer and Emal Pasarly is the editor.

In 2015, due to its huge popularity, high demand and growing viewership, the programme was relaunched and rebranded as BBC Naray Da Wakht (BBC World Right Now). The new 24 minutes show goes live from London in peak time (18.00 Kabul time) on the same partner network Shamshad TV. The new vibrant, hard-hitting live programme provides Pashto speakers with in-depth reporting, analysis and interviews. It also has a weekly interactive segment, Staso Ghazh (Have Your Say), containing live phone-ins, social media round ups, comments, video, pictures and audio content from viewers. The programme is presented by lead anchors Sana Safi and Amanullah Atta.

Based on a survey conducted by the BBC in 2015, BBC Pashto content reaches 6.5 million people in Afghanistan, Pakistan and the rest of the world (2015).

Female Editor 
Safia Haleem was its first female editor. She was born in Peshawar, northwestern Pakistan, and graduated from Peshawar University. As a writer and historian Ms Haleem has authored several books in Pashto and English.

Programmes 
 Stasy Ghag (Have Your Say)
 Naray Da Wakht (World Right Now)
 Da Malghalaro Amil (Art Show)
 Wama Studio (Studio 7)
 Nima Narai (Half of the World)
 Jor Taza (How Are You)
 Khaza Aw Nananai Naray (Afghan Woman Hour)
 Global Newsbeat
 Pilwazai (Art and Literature)
 De Fekr Lari (The Path Of Thought)
 Rogha Sata (Good Health)
 Da Woonai Bahs (Weekly Debate)

Awards 
 Sony Radio Award for Service to Public Health
 'Team of the Year' at the first BBC World Service Awards, 2007
 New York Festivals World's Best Radio Programme, 2007

Schedule 
The section has over 3 hours of live transmissions - 01:30-05:30GMT, 14:00-17:00GMT and 1330GMT.

Journalists 
Some of its most famous journalists are:
 Mirwais Jalil
 Gohar Rahman Gohar 
 Nabi Misdaq
 Amanullah Atta
 Safia Haleem
 Jafar Ali Khan
 Yaqub Kakar
 Kamal Behzadi
 Daud Junbish
 Akhtar Kohistani
 Ismail Niaz
 Ahmed Omaid Khpalwak 
 Abdul Samad Rohani
 Saeeda Mahmood 
 Sana Safi
 Yasmin Hussain 
 Ghulam Zarmalwal 
 Abdul Ali Arghandawi
 Dawood Azami
 Najiba Kasraee
 Emal Pasarly 
 Wali Abdullah Narogh 
 Spin Tanay
 Shir Aqa Karimi

See also
BBC Bangla
BBC Hausa
BBC Persian
BBC Urdu

External links 
 BBC Pashto Facebook
 BBC Pashto Twitter
 BBC Pashto Webpage
 BBC Pashto Instagram 
 BBC Pashto Google+
 BBC Pashto Youtube

References 

Pashto mass media
Mass media in Afghanistan
BBC
Pashto-language mass media
Pashto-language newspapers
Pashto-language television
Pashto-language television shows
Pashto-language television stations
British Pakistani mass media
Pashto-language websites
Pashto
Radio stations established in 1981